Deborah Jean Israel (born November 10, 1964) is an associate judge of the Superior Court of the District of Columbia.

Education and career 
In 1986, Israel earned her Bachelor of Arts from Rutgers University and in 1990, she received her Juris Doctor from Rutgers School of Law.

D.C. Superior Court 
President Barack Obama nominated Israel on September 27, 2016, to become an associate judge on the Superior Court of the District of Columbia. Her nomination expired on January 3, 2017, with the end of the 114th United States Congress.

President Donald Trump nominated her on September 7, 2017, to the same court to the seat on the vacated by Melvin R. Wright. Her nomination expired on January 4, 2019, with the end of the 115th United States Congress. On May 2, 2019, President Trump renominated Israel to the same seat on the court. On October 22, 2019, the Senate Committee on Homeland Security and Governmental Affairs held a hearing on her nomination. The Senate confirmed her nomination on November 21, 2019, by voice vote.

References

1964 births
Living people
21st-century American judges
21st-century American women judges
Rutgers University alumni
Rutgers School of Law–Camden alumni
Judges of the Superior Court of the District of Columbia
People from Atlantic City, New Jersey